The Teichosporaceae are a family of fungi in the order Pleosporales.

References

Pleosporales
Dothideomycetes families
Taxa named by Margaret Elizabeth Barr-Bigelow
Taxa described in 2002